The Henry Schick Barn, located southeast of Buhl, Idaho, was built in 1914 by Henry Schick, a German-Russian immigrant to the United States.  It was listed on the National Register of Historic Places in 1983. The barn features walls and milking stalls that were cast in place in concrete, and custom-made metal onion domes.

References

Barns on the National Register of Historic Places in Idaho
Buildings and structures completed in 1914
Buildings and structures in Twin Falls County, Idaho
German-Russian culture in Idaho
National Register of Historic Places in Twin Falls County, Idaho